Eysteinn Valdason was a 10th-century Icelandic skald. Three half-stanzas from a poem about Thor are all that survive of his work. Preserved in Snorri Sturluson's Skáldskaparmál (4) only, they deal with Thor's fishing expedition with the giant Hymir, where the god attempts to kill Jörmungandr.

External links
Eysteinn's poetry in Old Norse with an English translation and notes

Icelandic male poets
10th-century Icelandic poets